Natale Vecchi (29 June 1917 – 4 December 1988) was an Italian wrestler. He competed in the men's freestyle heavyweight at the 1952 Summer Olympics.

References

External links
 

1917 births
1988 deaths
Italian male sport wrestlers
Olympic wrestlers of Italy
Wrestlers at the 1952 Summer Olympics
Sportspeople from the Province of Reggio Emilia
20th-century Italian people
World Wrestling Championships medalists